Charlie Lee (born 13 May 1998 in Kingston-upon-Thames) is an English professional squash player. As of October 2018, he was ranked number 87 in the world.

References

1998 births
Living people
English male squash players